Albert Victor Butler (died 13 May 1916), known as Ben Butler, was an English professional footballer who played as a centre half in the Southern League for Reading.

Personal life 
Butler supplemented his football income by working as an engine cleaner for the South East Railway Company. During the First World War, he served as a corporal in the 1st Football Battalion of the Middlesex Regiment. On 3 May 1916, Butler was wounded in the right leg by a shell during urban combat in Liévin, France. The leg was subsequently amputated and he died as a result 10 days later at No.22 Casualty Clearing Station in Bruay-la-Buissière. Butler left a widow, Kate and two sons and was buried in Bruay Communal Cemetery Extension. Butler's will, in which he left everything to Kate, survives and is in the archives of Her Majesty's Courts and Tribunals Service.

Career statistics

Honours 
Reading
Southern League Second Division: 1910–11

References 

Year of birth missing
1916 deaths
Reading F.C. players
British military personnel killed in World War I
Middlesex Regiment soldiers
Southern Football League players
Sportspeople from Reading, Berkshire
Association football wing halves
Hartlepool United F.C. players
Queens Park Rangers F.C. players
English footballers
British Army personnel of World War I
English amputees
Association footballers with limb difference
English disabled sportspeople
Footballers from Berkshire
Military personnel from Reading, Berkshire